May refer to  Dr. Doctor, a character in South Park or to DrDoctor, a medical technology company.

Alternatively, may refer to Doctor Willard Bliss MD, often known humorously as "Dr. Doctor".